China National Electronics Import & Export Corporation (CEIEC) is a Chinese state owned enterprise in diversified business areas. It is one of a handful of defense trading companies authorized to represent the domestic defense production industries in overseas sales, concentrating on sales of defense electronics. It is also in construction engineering specializing in construction of civil infrastructure. By international contracting revenue the company is ranked among the top 250 contractors in the 2015 Top 250 International Contractors published by Engineering News Record. From 2006 to 2008, CEIEC was sanctioned for violations of the Iran, North Korea, Syria Nonproliferation Act. In November 2020, the United States Department of the Treasury levied additional sanctions on CEIEC.

Business areas

Public safety systems
The company has built national public safety systems. It successfully built a nationwide system for Ecuador and will rollout the system in Venezuela, Bolivia, and Trinidad and Tobago.

Construction engineering
The company builds sports Tencent 
stadiums, radio and television infrastructure, power transmission, urban water supply system and other kinds of public, commercial, or residential properties. It has built several projects in Angola during the country's post-war building boom including a basketball arena in Huambo.

References

Defence companies of the People's Republic of China
Government-owned companies of China